Dark Venture was an American radio anthology thriller series created by director Leonard Reeg and producer J. Donald Wilson. John Lake narrated the show.

Dark Venture originated at the ABC's KECA facilities in Los Angeles. The series ran for 52 episodes between February 1946 and February 1947.  ABC took Dark Venture series nationwide on February 19, 1946.

The first episode of Dark Venture  began with an introduction by Lake: 
“Over the minds of mortal men come many shadows… shadows of greed and hate, jealousy and fear. Darkness is absence of light… so in the sudden shadows which fog the minds of men and are to be found in the strange impulses which urge them on to their venture…in the dark.”

The introduction had subtle changes in different episodes to reflect the journeying into the unknown.

The stories  on Dark Venture  gave the listener the murderer's point of view. The episodes were an adventure of a distorted reality where people were scheming ways to kill someone and try to get away with it. The killers had no sense of right or wrong and nothing would get in their way. Victims were usually killed by strangulation, knifing, or shooting.

Killers devised cruel mind games such as tricking a wife into believing she was going insane, or manipulating a business associate into thinking he was being stalked by a lover who did not exist. Both of these elaborate plots were thought up to provide a scapegoat for the murderer. However, small details that they forgot to cover ultimately unraveled their evil plan at the end of each episode.

References

American radio dramas
Anthology radio series
1946 radio programme debuts
1947 radio programme endings
1940s American radio programs